is a former Japanese football player and manager.

Coaching career
Eto was born in Kyoto Prefecture on April 21, 1973. After he was assumed in 2015 into the J3 League club; and as head coach of AC Nagano Parceiro, he became the manager in August 2015 in place of Naohiko Minobe. After failing to gain a promotion with the squad in the J3 League, he signed with Thespakusatsu Gunma to become one of their coaches in 2016. He left Thespakusatsu at the end of the 2016 season.

Managerial statistics

References

External links

1973 births
Living people
Association football people from Kyoto Prefecture
Japanese footballers
Japanese football managers
J3 League managers
AC Nagano Parceiro managers
Association footballers not categorized by position